Tellos Agras (c. 1880 – 7 June 1907) was the nom de guerre of Sarantis-Tellos Agapinos, a Greek officer of the Hellenic Army who played a prominent role during the Greek Struggle for Macedonia.

Early life 
Agras was born in Gargalianoi, Messenia in about 1880, from an important family of that region, members of which had participated in the Greek War of Independence. He entered the Hellenic Military Academy, from where he graduated as lieutenant of the Hellenic Army in 1901.

The increasing presence of Bulgarian Internal Macedonian Revolutionary Organization guerrilla troops in Ottoman-held Macedonia and their actions against the followers of the Patriarchate of Constantinople and generally against the Macedonian Greek population concerned Greek public opinion in Athens, which led to the creation of some underground organizations financed by wealthy Greeks, initially without official support, with the intention of establishing Greek military bands in Macedonia to confront the threat. Agras entered one of these organizations, the Macedonian Committee in 1904, after the death of Pavlos Melas.

The Bulgarian troops were often allied with Aromanian armatole soldiers.

Tellos Agras was Agapinos' pseudonym. Tellos meant "perfect" and "complete" but also "the one from afar", "the one who is not among us". On the other hand, Agras meant "fierce", "untamed", "wild".

Involvement in the Macedonian Struggle 

In September 1906, he entered Macedonia leading a 14 men band with the mission to protect Macedonian Greek villages in Giannitsa Lake (called O Valtos, i.e., "the Swamp" by locals) from the attacks of VMRO members that controlled the northern part of the lake. With the help of local Macedonian Greeks such as the wealthy tradesman Zafeiris Loggos and Antonis Mingas (actually an ethnic Bulgarian) from Naoussa, in only three months he managed to limit Bulgarian presence in the Swamp. But on November 14, 1906 Agras was seriously injured after an unsuccessful attack against the leader of the Bulgarian guerrilla troops, Apostol Petkov, near the village of Zervochori and was recalled to Thessaloniki to be healed. He continued his activity in the area for some months but his health deteriorated by his continuous presence and fights in the lake, resulting in his infection by malaria. The coordinator of the Greek forces, Konstantinos Mazarakis-Ainian, concerned for his life, ordered Agras to withdraw to Naoussa in April 1907, where he started recruiting locals to man the band of his substitute Captain Amyntas, alias Lieutenant Doumpiotis.

Death 
The Ottoman forces, although initially passive and not intervening in Greek-Bulgarian fights, began attacking both, worried by the presence of so many armed bands in the area. That led Agras to seek cooperation with the leaders of the Bulgarian forces of the area against the Turks and a meeting was arranged on June 3, 1907 between Agras and his opponent, Captain Zlatan, near the town of Aghia Foteini, 10km north of Naoussa. According to their agreement each group would be unarmed. In the event, the Bulgarians came armed and Agras, with his close friend Antonios Mingas were arrested by Zlatan and later hanged on June 7 outside the village of Tekhovo.

The news of his death shocked the local Greek population and his fellow fighters who continued his work and eventually managed to predominate in the area of Giannitsa Lake, after the decisive victory of Captain Amyntas against Zlatan on June 30 in Xeroleivado.

Legacy 

Tellos Agras is considered to be a martyr of the Greek Struggle for Macedonia and one of its most important and effective band leaders. 

He and his exploits are better known through the pages of the novel Ta Mystika tou Valtou ("The Secrets of the Marsh"), written by Penelope Delta.

A village in Pella close to the site of his death was named Agras in his honour.

There is a memorial at the location of his hanging between Karydia and Agras. 

There is a bust of him in Thessaloniki.

In September 2022, the memorial busts of Argas and of other figures in the Greek Struggle for Macedonia in Edessa were decapitated and vandalized.

Other Images

References

Dakin Douglas. The Greek Struggle in Macedonia 1897-1913. Thessaloniki, 1966, .
Vakalopoulos, Apostolos. History of the Greek Nation 1204-1985.
Archives of the Macedonian Struggle of Penelope Delta, Thessaloniki, 1959.
Mazarakis-Ainian, Konstantinos. The Macedonian Struggle.

External links
Museum of the Macedonian Struggle, Thessaloniki

1880s births
1907 deaths
Eastern Orthodox Christians from Greece
Greek military personnel of the Macedonian Struggle
Hellenic Army officers
People from Gargalianoi